Makhbuta  is a Syrian village located in Uqayribat Subdistrict in Salamiyah District, Hama.  According to the Syria Central Bureau of Statistics (CBS), Makhbuta had a population of 220 in the 2004 census.

References 

Populated places in Salamiyah District